Moungi Gabriel Bawendi is an American chemist of French and Tunisian descent. Born in Paris in 1961 to Hélène Baouendi (née Bobard) and Mohammed Salah Baouendi. He is the Lester Wolfe Professor at the Massachusetts Institute of Technology.  Bawendi is one of the original participants in the field of colloidal quantum dot research, and among the most cited chemists of the last decade. He became a Clarivate Citation Laureate in 2020. He received his A.B. in 1982 from Harvard University and his Ph.D. in Chemistry in 1988 from the University of Chicago working with Karl F. Freed and Takeshi Oka.

Research Group
The Bawendi Research Group is largely focused on the study of colloidal semiconductor quantum dots, with a growing interest in organic fluorophores. Research projects are generally divided into four categories: 1. Spectroscopy, 2. Synthesis, 3. Biology, and 4. Devices. In 1993 the group reported what is currently the most widely used method in quantum dot synthesis, called the rapid injection method. Later research focused extensively on the spectroscopic study of quantum dots, and lasers, while recent progress has addressed many challenges in synthesis, biological application of nanomaterials, and solar cell research. In addition, Bawendi is interested in the spectroscopy of single quantum dots with single molecule spectroscopy.

References

Living people
Massachusetts Institute of Technology School of Science faculty
21st-century American chemists
Harvard University alumni
1961 births